Bohubrihi was one of the most popular drama serials ever aired on Bangladesh Television. The bangla word Bohubrihi means the multiple dimension of anything and here it means the mystery of life. The story was written by famous author, dramatist, screenwriter, playwright and filmmaker Humayun Ahmed. "Bohubrihi" the same named book is an adaptation from the drama serial, which is an extremely rare case for the creator Humayun Ahmed. The serial was popular for symbolic presentation of social facts as well as witty comments from even the most ordinary roles.

Premise 
The main characters of the Sitcom is Mr. Sobhan, who is a wealthy retired family person living with his family in Dhanmondi, Dhaka in a house named "Niribili". And the main characteristics of this person is he is always involve in finding social and cultural problems around him, but unfortunately all his plan fails at the end as almost every problems he found had nothing to do with the reality. He loves to write down the problems in a big note books and his wife Minu was always irritated with that. Mr. Anis was a tenant in his house, who is a widower having two children, only thing he was good at was giving people a good suggestion. All the problems identified by Mr. Sobhan was always criticized by Mr. Anis, until one day when Mr. Sobhan came up with the idea to work with the names of the martyrs of 1971 Bangladesh Liberation War.

Cast
The major casts of the drama serial were as follows.
 Abul Hayat as Mr. Sobhan
 Aleya Ferdousi  as Minu, Mr. Sobhan's wife
 Aly Zaker as Farid Mama
 Lutfun Nahar Lota as Mili
 Nahid Zaman as Bilu
 Asaduzzaman Noor as Anis
 Afzal Sharif as Kader
 Mahmuda Khatun  as Rahima's mother
 Torsha Khan as Togor
 Rehnuma Tarannum as Nisha
 Lucky Enam as Esha
 Afzal Hossain as Doctor
 Abul Khair as Emdad Khondokar
 Nazmul Huda Bachchu as Karim
 Dipa Islam as Putul

References

1988 Bangladeshi television series debuts
1989 Bangladeshi television series endings
1980s Bangladeshi television series
Bangladeshi drama television series
Bengali-language television programming in Bangladesh
Bangladesh Television original programming